Making Music may refer to:

 Making Music (Bill Withers album), 1975
 Making Music (Hi-5 album), an album by Hi-5 released in 2005
 Making Music (Zakir Hussain album), 1987
 Making Music (magazine), a bi-monthly lifestyle music magazine
 Making Music (organisation)
 "Making Music", a song by Sophie Ellis-Bextor from her 2003 album Shoot from the Hip
 "Making Music", an episode of the television series Teletubbies

See also
The Making of Music, a BBC Radio 4 documentary series